The Opel Gran Turismo Coupé Concept, abbreviated as Opel GTC Concept, was a concept car that was manufactured by Opel and designed to be a coupé version of the Opel Vectra C . The GTC premiered at the 77th Geneva Motor Show in 2007. The Opel GTC was a grand tourer.

Specifications
The base and floorpan came from the platform General Motors Epsilon II but were modified for all wheel drive to apply the power effectively. 

Influence

The Opel Vectra went out of production in July 2008. Design cues of the Opel GTC were then used on the Opel Insignia, an upmarket replacement for the Vectra which was launched in October 2008. However, no coupé version of the Insignia was ever made available.

References

External links

GTC
Cars introduced in 2007
Grand tourers
Coupés